Hill River may refer to:

 Hill River (Western Australia), river and town
 Hill River (Lost River), a river in Minnesota
 Hill River (Willow River), a river in Minnesota
 Hill River State Forest, a state forest in Minnesota
Hill River, South Australia, a locality
Hill River (South Australia), a river
 Hill River Township, Minnesota, town

See also 
 Eagle Hill River
 Little Hill River
 Polish Hill River
 Red Hill River
 Sand Hill River
 Smoky Hill River
 Woodford Hill River
 North Fork Smoky Hill River